Menemerus brachygnathus is a genus of jumping spider.

Distribution
Menemerus brachygnathus is found in various places in Asia including Nepal, India, Thailand and Japan.

Description
Menemerus brachygnathus is mottled brown. Its legs have stripes of dark brown and beige.

References

External links 
 Jumpingspider.com
 ITIS
 Catalogueoflife.org

Salticidae
Spiders described in 1887